Dąbkowizna railway station is a railway station in Wólka Radzymińska, Legionowo, Poland. It is served by Koleje Mazowieckie.

History
Dąbkowizna is a former village in the vicinity of Nieporęt in Masovian Voivodeship in central Poland. Located on the Legionowo-Tłuszcz railway, right to the north of Wólka Radzymińska, the village was abandoned some time before World War II. During the war two bunkers were built along the railway by the Wehrmacht as part of their planned Festung Warschau. Currently the name is used only by a forester's estate and a PKP single-platform train station.

References

Station article at kolej.one.pl

External links

Railway stations in Warsaw
Former populated places in Poland